Volleyball events were contested at the 1983 Summer Universiade in Edmonton, Alberta, Canada.

References
 Universiade volleyball medalists on HickokSports

U
1983 Summer Universiade
Volleyball at the Summer Universiade